Professor Theraphan Luangthongkum (also cited variously as L-Thongkum, L. Thongkum or Thongkum in publications) is a Thai linguist, specializing in phonetics, linguistic fieldwork, lexicography and minority languages of Southeast Asia. She is currently a faculty member of the Department of Linguistics, the Faculty of Arts, Chulalongkorn University, Thailand.

In 2010 she was awarded an honorary membership by the Linguistics Society of America, making her the first Thai linguist to receive this honor.

Education
Prof. Luangthongkum graduated from the Faculty of Arts, Chulalongkorn University in 1968 with a BA (2nd class honors) in English. She then went to the University of California at Davis, where she received her MA in Linguistics in 1970.  With a scholarship from the Ford Foundation, she furthered her studies in phonetics at the University of Edinburgh, where she obtained her Ph.D. in 1977.

Awards
Distinguished Researcher Award (Humanities), National Research Council of Thailand (NRCT), 2002.
Outstanding Research Award (Humanities), National Research Council of Thailand (NRCT), 2002.
Distinguished Professor Award (Humanities), Chulalongkorn University, 2003.
Distinguished Professor Award, The Eakin Laugesen Memorial Fund, 2006.
Distinguished Research Award, the Academic Affairs Section, the Thailand Research Fund (TRF), 2007.

References

External links
Linguistic Society of America
Department of Linguistics, Faculty of Arts, Chulalongkorn University
Professor Theraphan Luangthongkum (L-Thongkum)

Living people
Theraphan Luangthongkum
Theraphan Luangthongkum
Linguists of Southeast Asian languages
Theraphan Luangthongkum
University of California, Davis alumni
Year of birth missing (living people)
Linguists of Kra–Dai languages
Linguists of Austroasiatic languages
Linguists of Hmong–Mien languages
Alumni of the University of Edinburgh